This is a list of the monastic houses in County Wicklow, Ireland

Notes

References

See also
List of monastic houses in Ireland

Wicklow
Monastic houses
Monastic houses
Monastic houses